Jemaat Moul Blad is a commune in Khémisset Province of the Rabat-Salé-Kénitra administrative region of Morocco. At the time of the 2004 census, the commune had a total population of 6429 people living in 1135 households.

References

Populated places in Khémisset Province
Rural communes of Rabat-Salé-Kénitra